The Georgetown Hoyas, representing Georgetown University, have had 42 players picked in the NBA Draft. Two Hoyas were the NBA first overall draft picks: Patrick Ewing in 1985 and Allen Iverson in 1996. Alonzo Mourning was the second overall pick in the 1992 draft. Other alumni have gone undrafted, but entered the NBA later, such as Jaren Jackson in 1989, and Henry Sims and Chris Wright in 2013.

Player selection

NBA Draft

WNBA Draft

References

External links
Georgetown Hoyas official site
NBA official site

Georgetown Hoyas men's basketball
Georgetown
Georgetown
Georgetown Hoyas NBA and WNBA drafts